Angel Veneroso Moreno (born June 6, 1955) is a former professional baseball player who played two seasons for the California Angels of Major League Baseball.

Career
Moreno began his career in 1975 with the Rieleros de Aguascalientes of the Mexican League, with whom he played for from 1975 to 1980 before joining the Los Angeles Angels organization. He made his debut on August 15, 1981, and played in 21 total Major League Baseball games, his last being a game on June 25, 1982. He spent 1983 in Minor League Baseball for the Angels and split 1984 in the minors for the Angels and Detroit Tigers. In 1988, Moreno played in 2 games with the Tigres Capitalinos of the Mexican League. After a six-year hiatus from professional baseball, Moreno played in two games with the Uni-President Lions of the Chinese Professional Baseball League in 1995. From 1998 to 1999, Moreno played in 29 games for the Wei Chuan Dragons of the Chinese Professional Baseball League, winning the Taiwan Series in 1998 and 1999. In 2000, Moreno played for the Diablos Rojos del Mexico of the Mexican League, and switched to the Algodoneros de Unión Laguna for the 2001 season. Moreno remained in the LMB in 2002 and 2003, playing for the Rojos del Aguila de Veracruz, also playing for the club in 2005. In 2006, Moreno played 8 games between Veracruz and the Diablos Rojos del Mexico before ending his playing career.

References

1955 births
Living people
Baseball players from Veracruz
California Angels players
Diablos Rojos del México players
Edmonton Trappers players
Evansville Triplets players
Leones de Yucatán players
Mexican Baseball Hall of Fame inductees
Major League Baseball pitchers
Major League Baseball players from Mexico
Mexican expatriate baseball players in Canada
Mexican expatriate baseball players in the United States
Mexican League baseball pitchers
Nuevo Laredo Tecolotes players
Rieleros de Aguascalientes players
Rojos del Águila de Veracruz players
Salt Lake City Gulls players
Spokane Indians players
Algodoneros de Unión Laguna players
Potros de Minatitlán players
Tecolotes de Nuevo Laredo players
Uni-President Lions players
Wei Chuan Dragons players
Yaquis de Obregón players
Expatriate baseball players in Taiwan
Tigres de Quintana Roo players